Wason Brazobán is a Dominican musician and songwriter, originally from Villa Mella, a sector north of Santo Domingo.

Charts
Brazobán has scored tropical airplay hits for his band as well as for stars such as Monchy & Alexandra, Hector Acosta and Domenic Marte. But Negros' pop single "En Un Solo Dia" is his group's first entry on the Hot Latin Songs chart, where it reached No. 47.

Discography
 Alma Mía (2010)

References

External links 
 
 

Year of birth missing (living people)
Living people
People from Santo Domingo Norte
Latin music musicians